Milan Milić (born 14 May 1998) is a Serbian handball player who plays for RK Vojvodina and the Serbian national team.

He represented Serbia at the 2019 World Men's Handball Championship.

References

1998 births
Living people
Serbian male handball players
Competitors at the 2018 Mediterranean Games
Competitors at the 2022 Mediterranean Games
Mediterranean Games bronze medalists for Serbia
Mediterranean Games medalists in handball